Barney Klecker (born August 25, 1951) is the United States former record holder for the 50 mile ultramarathon, finishing with a time of four hours fifty one minutes and twenty five seconds. This record was set on October 5, 1980, at the AMJA Ultramarathon in Chicago, Illinois. 
Klecker is a two-time champion of the City of Lakes Marathon/Twin Cities Marathon (1977, 1979) and the Edmund Fitzgerald 100 km (1982, 1986). He was also the winner of the first two runnings of the Tallahassee Ultradistance Classic (1982, 1983). Klecker won the 1978 Grandma's Marathon (2 hours 18 minutes and 42 seconds).

Klecker married Janis Horns, another runner from Minnesota who later competed in the marathon at the 1992 Summer Olympics as Janis Klecker. Barney Klecker was and Janis Klecker is an American record holder in the 50 K.

Klecker ran track and cross country at the University of Wisconsin–Stout.
Barney has 6 children, including Joe Klecker.

Achievements
All results regarding marathon, unless stated otherwise

Notes

References

1951 births
Living people
American male long-distance runners
University of Wisconsin–Stout alumni
American male ultramarathon runners